Anderson Junior College (AJC) was a junior college established in 1984 and located in Yio Chu Kang, Singapore, offering two-year pre-university courses leading to the Singapore-Cambridge GCE Advanced Level examinations.

In 2019, it was merged with Serangoon Junior College (SRJC) and renamed as Anderson Serangoon Junior College. The new junior college remained at AJC's site.

History 
Anderson Junior College was the 11th junior college to be established in Singapore and received its first batch of students in 1984. It celebrates its anniversary on the fifth of April each year. The Anderson Junior College Hostel was planned and construction commenced in 2009. The hostel was opened in 2012.

On 20 April 2017, it was announced that AJC would merge with the merged school located at the current site of AJC. The merged school was named as Anderson Serangoon Junior College, which is a combination of the two schools' names, from 2019.

Principal

Identity and culture

Crest
The college crest is formed from the initials of the college. The letter A, in the form of a yellow flame, symbolises the vitality and youthful aspirations of the students. The dark blue letters, J and C, supporting the flame, symbolise college support for the individual in his efforts to realise his ambition. The four circles at the base depict racial harmony, highlighting the college motto.

The crest was designed by Mr. Heng Eng Hwa in 1984.

Motto
The college motto is Non Mihi Solum, which is Latin for Not for Myself Alone.

House system 
For competitive intra-school events, the school population is divided into five houses:
 Jaguar(Red)
 Panther(Yellow)
 Puma(Green)
 Cheetah(Grey)
 Cougar(Blue)

The House Committee is in charge of each house, with each house having at The House Captain and the Vice-Captain. The house committee is made up of student councillors.

Campus

Anderson Junior College Hostel 
The Anderson Junior College Hostel was opened in 2012, providing accommodation for scholars in AJC as well as those from Nanyang Junior College, Anderson Secondary School, Nan Chiau High School and Catholic High School. It was permanently closed from 2019 as MOE announced that demand for boarding places continue to fall and there are fewer international students in schools in Singapore.

Academic information 
Anderson Junior College offers both Arts and Science courses that leads up to the Singapore-Cambridge GCE Advanced Level examinations.

Co-curricular activities (CCA)

Notable alumni
 He Ying Ying: Singaporean actress
 Jasmine Ser: Olympian (Shooting)
 Tay Kexin: Singer-songwriter

References 

Junior colleges in Singapore
Educational institutions established in 1984
Schools in Ang Mo Kio
1984 establishments in Singapore
Education in North-East Region, Singapore